Jean Dušek (8 June 1891 – 2 March 1966) was a Czechoslovak sculptor. His work was part of the art competitions at the 1924 Summer Olympics and the 1936 Summer Olympics.

References

1891 births
1966 deaths
Czechoslovak sculptors
Olympic competitors in art competitions
People from Čadca District